Velvet is an unincorporated community in Stevens County, in the U.S. state of Washington. It is located on Washington State Route 25 just south of the Canadian border.

History
A post office called Velvet was established in 1912 and closed in 1920. The community took its name from nearby Velvet Mine. Velvet was located on the Great Northern Railway.

References

Unincorporated communities in Stevens County, Washington
Unincorporated communities in Washington (state)